Alan MacNaughtan (4 March 1920 – 29 August 2002) was a Scottish actor, born in Bearsden, Dunbartonshire, Scotland. He was educated at the Glasgow Academy, trained at RADA, and graduated in 1940 with the Bancroft Gold Medal. An experienced Old Vic, West End and Broadway actor, he became active in television and certain films between 1954 and 1999.

Television career
MacNaughtan played many guest roles in productions of the 1960s and 1970s including Dr. Finlay's Casebook, The Avengers, The Baron, "The Maze" (ATV/ITC, 1966), Department S, Who Plays the Dummy? (ATV/ITC, 1969), The Saint, The Professionals, A Stirring of Dust (LWT/Avengers Mark 1, 1978). He also played Major Brenan, a deceptive MI5 agent in The Ghost Talks (Randall and Hopkirk Deceased) in 1969. MacNaughtan's sharp blue eyes and features meant that he often played a villain in such ITC series.

He appeared at Laurence Olivier's National Theatre in roles which brought "considerable acclaim"; including in 1972, as Walter Burns in a revival of The Front Page.

MacNaughtan played Sir Geoffrey Wellingham in Yorkshire Television's The Sandbaggers, Dr. Crawley in Thames Television's Mr Palfrey of Westminster, and portrayed the acerbic teacher Howarth in the 1981 BBC serial To Serve Them All My Days. He played the role of Sir Percy Browne, head of MI5, in A Very British Coup in 1988.

His last role was an appearance in Kavanagh QC in 1999.

Films
He made a few appearances in films including starring alongside Dirk Bogarde as his disapproving brother-in-law in the then controversial Victim (1961). He also had roles in Frankenstein Created Woman (1967), Patton (1970), Family Life (1971), Shadowlands (1985), The Last Days of Patton (1986), Blue Ice (1992), and The Commissioner (1998).

He was a friend of actor Alec McCowen.

MacNaughtan died of cancer on 29 August 2002, aged 82.

Filmography

References

External links
 

 Obituary

1920 births
2002 deaths
Deaths from cancer in England
Scottish male stage actors
Scottish male film actors
Scottish male television actors
People from Bearsden
People educated at the Glasgow Academy